Ida County is a county located in the U.S. state of Iowa. As of the 2020 census the population was 7,005, making it the state's eighth-least populous county. The county seat is Ida Grove. The county was authorized by the Iowa Legislature in January 1851 as a packet of projected counties in unorganized territory of western Iowa. It was named after Ida Smith, the first child of European immigrants to be born in this region.

History
The Iowa Legislature authorized the formation of 49 counties in previously–unregulated western Iowa on January 15, 1851. This date is usually cited as the date of formation of Ida County; however, as there were no inhabitants of that area, no action was taken to form a county government.

On January 12, 1853, the Legislature authorized creation of Woodbury County, and included the proviso that the area of Ida County be included with Woodbury for revenue, election, and judicial purposes. In 1853 there were still no settlers in Ida County's lands.

The county's first permanent settlers (Comstock and Moorehead) arrived in 1856. In 1858 the county government was organized, with John Moorehead appointed County Judge. There were about 40 county residents at that time.

The county's only postoffice, as well as the first courthouse, was operated from Judge Moorehead's house.

The county's first dedicated school building was raised in 1861.

The county's first newspaper, Ida County Pioneer, was started in 1872. The first bank opened in 1876. Railroads arrived in Ida County in 1877, when the Maple Valley branch of the Chicago & North Western Railway was built. This resulted in a flood of settlers, and within five years, nearly all the available land had been purchased.

Geography

Major highways
 U.S. Highway 20 – runs east–west through the northern part of the county, passing Holstein.
 U.S. Highway 59 – runs generally north–south through the center of the county, passing Ida Grove. Its exit at south county line is five miles east of its entry point on north county line.
 Iowa Highway 31 – cuts across the northwestern tip of Ida County, running southwest from Cherokee County to Woodbury County.
 Iowa Highway 175 – runs east–west through the southern part of the county, passing Ida Grove.

Adjacent counties
Cherokee County  (north)
Sac County  (east)
Crawford County  (south)
Woodbury County  (west)

Demographics

2020 census
There were 3,352 housing units, of which 2,940 were occupied.

2010 census
There were 3,426 housing units, of which 3,052 were occupied.

2000 census

As of the census of 2000, there were 7,837 people, 3,213 households, and 2,184 families residing in the county. The population density was 18 people per square mile (7/km2). There were 3,506 housing units at an average density of 8 per square mile (3/km2). The racial makeup of the county was 99.02% White, 0.10% Black or African American, 0.06% Native American, 0.24% Asian, 0.15% from other races, and 0.42% from two or more races. 0.47% of the population were Hispanic or Latino of any race.

There were 3,213 households, out of which 29.40% had children under the age of 18 living with them, 59.50% were married couples living together, 5.90% had a female householder with no husband present, and 32.00% were non-families. 29.30% of all households were made up of individuals, and 15.90% had someone living alone who was 65 years of age or older. The average household size was 2.39 and the average family size was 2.95.

In the county, the population was spread out, with 25.50% under the age of 18, 6.10% from 18 to 24, 24.00% from 25 to 44, 22.70% from 45 to 64, and 21.80% who were 65 years of age or older. The median age was 42 years. For every 100 females there were 93.90 males. For every 100 females age 18 and over, there were 91.40 males.

The median income for a household in the county was $34,805, and the median income for a family was $43,179. Males had a median income of $29,002 versus $19,417 for females. The per capita income for the county was $18,675. About 5.70% of families and 8.80% of the population were below the poverty line, including 9.10% of those under age 18 and 8.60% of those age 65 or over.

Communities

Cities

Arthur
Battle Creek
Galva
Holstein
Ida Grove

Unincorporated communities

Townships

 Battle
 Blaine
 Corwin
 Douglas
 Galva
 Garfield
 Grant
 Griggs
 Hayes
 Logan
 Maple
 Silver Creek

Population ranking
The population ranking of the following table is based on the 2020 census of Ida County.

† county seat

Politics

Education
School districts include:
 Denison Community School District
 Galva-Holstein Community School District
 Maple Valley-Anthon Oto Community School District
 Odebolt Arthur Battle Creek Ida Grove Community School District
 River Valley Community School District
 Schaller-Crestland Community School District
 Schleswig Community School District

Former school districts:
 Battle Creek-Ida Grove Community School District
 Maple Valley Community School District
 Odebolt-Arthur Community School District

See also

Ida County Courthouse
National Register of Historic Places listings in Ida County, Iowa
Waveland Round Barn, listed on the National Register of Historic Places

References

External links

Ida County - County Officials
Ida County Economic Development
Ida County Sheriff

 
1851 establishments in Iowa
Populated places established in 1851